Boe & Quilla District is one of 17 sub-district of Nimba County, Liberia. As of 2008, the population was 18,262. The clans of Boe & Quilla district: Boe, Gosenter, Quella, Sarlay.

References

  

Districts of Liberia
Nimba County